The Manila South Cemetery is a cemetery in Metro Manila. It is an exclave of San Andres, Manila surrounded by land under the jurisdiction of the city of Makati.

History 

The land which the cemetery occupies was previously part of the Hacienda San Pedro de Macati which was owned by the Ayala-Roxas-Zóbel family. The land was then under the province of Rizal. The South Cemetery was legally acquired by Ordinance 726 and other actions taken by the Jacobo Zobel et al. vs. City of Manila (1925).

As of June 30, 2007, 266,170 burials were made in the cemetery. There were an estimated 753,186 burials as of July 2018.

On All Saints' Day 2015, a record 32,000 people visited the cemetery.

The Manila City Government under Mayor Isko Moreno in 2020 passed Ordinance No. 8608 allotting  within the Manila South Cemetery for the establishment of the Manila Muslim Cemetery. The groundbreaking ceremony for the Muslim cemetery was held on July 22, 2020. The cemetery was inaugurated as the Manila Islamic Cemetery on June 7, 2021.

Notable burials

 Ramon Bagatsing (1916–2006), longest serving Mayor of Manila, survivor of the Plaza Miranda bombing
 Leon Guinto (1886–1962), Mayor of Manila during World War II, Governor of Quezon
 Augusto S. Francisco (1911–1961), former Congressman of Manila's 4th district
 Jose Vicente D. Abad Santos (1903–1965), nephew of Jose Abad Santos, the Fifth Chief Justice of the Supreme Court of the Philippines and served as Acting President of the Philippines during World War II, which was executed by Japanese soldier in Cebu with his son Pepito
 Elpidio Quirino (1890–1956), former 6th president of the Philippines (reinterred at the Libingan ng mga Bayani on February 29, 2016)
 Espiridiona Bonifacio (1875–1956), nationalist and revolutionary, and sister of Andrés Bonifacio
 Cornelia "Angge" Lee (1946–2017), talent manager, coordinator and actress
 Lucrecia Roces Kasilag (1918–2008),  composer, music educator, and National Artist for Music
 Lope K. Santos (1879–1963), novelist, linguist, and grammarian of the Filipino language
 Paraluman (1923–2009), actress of the 1950s, her remains were later exhumed and moved to undisclosed location
 Jose "Joey" D. Hizon, Jr. (1954–2016), former congressman of Manila's 5th District
 Rafaelita Soriano (1915–2007), former ambassador, educator, scholar, researcher, historian, and Kapampangan cultural advocate
 Roberto "Betong" Gonzales (1942–2009), actor and the king of karate
 Rolando Gonzales (1939–2003), actor and martial artist
 Gerard Fainsan (1974–1997), former member of the Universal Motion Dancers
 OG Kaybee (1988–2022), rapper
 Pstr. Roy Q. Pineda (1964–2021), emmanuelians pastor and school service driver of Emmanuel Christian School, Santa Rosa City, Laguna

See also
 Quezon Memorial Circle
 La Loma Cemetery
 Manila Chinese Cemetery
 Libingan ng mga Bayani
 Manila American Cemetery and Memorial
 Manila North Cemetery
 Scouting memorials

References

Cemeteries in Metro Manila
Landmarks in the Philippines
Mausoleums used as housing
Buildings and structures in San Andres, Manila
Enclaves and exclaves
Muslim cemeteries